Homona bicornis is a species of moth of the family Tortricidae. It is found in the Philippines on the island of Luzon.

References

Moths described in 1968
Homona (moth)